Harold "Buster" Hair (born Harold O. Hair Jr. May 29, 1932) is a retired American professional third baseman and shortstop who played in the Negro leagues in the 1950s. Playing for the Birmingham Black Barons and Kansas City Monarchs during his baseball career, Hair was an above average contact hitter whose best season came in 1958 with the Monarchs.

Born in Jacksonville, Florida, Hair attended North Carolina Agricultural and Technical State University, and played on four consecutive championship-winning teams. He finished his senior year as captain of the team and went on to earn a master's degree in Education at the University of Florida.

In 1953, Hair signed with Birmingham Barons and, as a rookie, he was invited to the East-West All-Star Game. His baseball career was interrupted in 1954 by obligations to the military. Afterwards, Hair joined the Kansas City Monarchs, a team he played with for four years. Hair's best statistical season was in 1958 when he led the Negro leagues with a .423 batting average.

Following his career in the Negro leagues, Hair coached baseball, basketball, and football in the Duval County school system. He is the first black basketball coach for William M. Raines High School, earning the coach of the year award for leading the team to a regional championship. In addition, Hair mentored future professional sports players, including Ken Burrough, Harold Carmichael, Harold Hart, and Leonard "Truck" Robinson.

References 

1932 births
Birmingham Black Barons players
Kansas City Monarchs players
Living people
21st-century African-American people